The 2021–22 Campeonato Nacional Feminino (also known as Liga BPI for sponsorship reasons) is the 37th edition of Campeonato Nacional Feminino.

On May 8, 2022 Benfica beat Sporting CP at home by 3-1 and became champion for the second time in its history.

Teams

16 teams contested the Campeonato Nacional de Futebol Feminino in 2021–22.

Team changes
To Campeonato Nacional
 Vilaverdense (runners-up)
 Atlético CP (semifinal loser to Sporting CP B)

From Campeonato Nacional
 Cadima (North Serie 5th)
 Fiães (North Serie 6th)
 Futebol Benfica (South Serie 5th)
 A-dos-Francos (South Serie 6th)
 Ovarense (Play-off loser)
 Damaiense (Play-off loser)

Format
The competition continued to be played in two stages, but the number of teams being reduced from 20 to 16. In the first stage, the 16 clubs will be divided in two series (North and South) of 8 teams, according to geographic criteria. In each series, teams play against each other once in a single round-robin system.

In the second stage, the four best-placed teams of each of the Series advanced to the championship group and the remaining teams to the relegation series. On the championship group, all eight teams play against each other in a home-and-away double round-robin system, to decide the champions. On the relegation series (North and South) the competition work in the same way, with the first and second placed teams being granted a place in 2022–23 Campeonato Nacional de Futebol Feminino. The eighth-placed team (last) was relegated while the teams place from third to seventh will play the relegation play-offs along with teams from Campeonato Nacional II Divisão placed second to fourth. Eight teams participate in the play-off, with the winner of each round advancing to the next one. Only the winner guarantees a place in 2022–23 Campeonato Nacional de Futebol Feminino.

First stage

North Serie

South Serie

Second stage

Championship group

Relegation Phase

Relegation play-offs

The teams placed third to seventh in the relegation group and the teams placed second to four in the 2021-22 Second Division League played against each other in a play-off championship to define the last team to play the 2022–23 Campeonato Nacional de Futebol Feminino.

Quarter-finals

|}

Semi-finals

|}

Final

Although Futebol Benfica won the play-off stage, they did not obtain the licensing required to participate in 2022–23 Campeonato Nacional de Futebol Feminino. Thus, Atlético Ouriense was invited instead.

References

External links 
 official website (fpf)

2021-22
Por
women's
Camp